Fred Stolle and Ann Jones were the defending champions, but Jones did not compete. Stolle partnered with Evonne Goolagong, but lost in the semifinals to Ilie Năstase and Rosie Casals.

Năstase and Casals defeated Alex Metreveli and Olga Morozova in the final, 6–3, 4–6, 9–7 to win the mixed doubles tennis title at the 1970 Wimbledon Championships.

Seeds

  Marty Riessen /  Margaret Court (second round, withdrew)
  Bob Hewitt /  Billie Jean King (third round)
  Frew McMillan /  Judy Tegart (semifinals)
  Dennis Ralston /  Françoise Dürr (second round, withdrew)

Draw

Finals

Top half

Section 1

Section 2

Section 3

Section 4

Bottom half

Section 5

Section 6

Section 7

Section 8

References

External links

1970 Wimbledon Championships – Doubles draws and results at the International Tennis Federation

X=Mixed Doubles
Wimbledon Championship by year – Mixed doubles